Joseph Anthony Ogrodowski (November 20, 1906 – June 24, 1959) is a former Major League Baseball pitcher. He played one game with the Boston Braves on April 27, 1925. Ogrodowski gave up six earned runs on six hits and three walks in one inning of relief for the Braves in the 7th inning against the Brooklyn Robins in a 15-2 loss.

References

External links

Boston Braves players
1900s births
1959 deaths
Baseball players from Pennsylvania
Major League Baseball pitchers
Lynn Papooses players
Albany Senators players
Elmira Red Wings players
Elmira Pioneers players